Joseph Hugo Vincenz Disse (25 December 1852 – 9 July 1912) was a German anatomist and histologist born in Brakel, North Rhine-Westphalia.

Biography
Disse studied at the University of Erlangen, and after graduation became an assistant to anatomist Heinrich von Waldeyer-Hartz (1836-1921) at Strassburg. From 1880 to 1888 he was an instructor at the University of Tokyo, and afterwards became an associate professor at the University of Göttingen. From 1895 to 1912 he was a professor at the University of Marburg.

He specialized in the fields of microscopic anatomy, embryology and histology. His name is associated with the "space of Disse", which is a perisinosoidal space of the liver.

References 
 
 University of Marburg, Internationalität in der Wissenschaft

German anatomists
German histologists
Academic staff of the University of Marburg
1852 births
1912 deaths
People from Höxter (district)
Physicians from North Rhine-Westphalia